Luther Monroe Perkins, Jr. (January 8, 1928 – August 5, 1968) was an American country music guitarist and a member of the Tennessee Three, the backup band for singer Johnny Cash. Perkins was an iconic figure in what would become known as rockabilly music. His creatively simple, sparsely embellished, rhythmic use of Fender Esquire, Jazzmaster and Jaguar guitars is credited for creating Cash's signature "boom-chicka-boom" style.

Early life and musical beginnings

Perkins was born in Como, Mississippi, the third of five children of Rev. Luther Monroe Perkins, Sr., a Baptist preacher, and Delphia Anna Stewart Perkins. He grew up in Como, and taught himself to play rhythm guitar.

Perkins started his career in 1953 as a mechanic at Automobile Sales Company in Memphis. He specialized in electrical systems and radio repairs. Roy Cash Sr., older brother of Johnny Cash, was the service manager at the dealership. At the time, the younger Cash was stationed in Germany with the US Air Force. At Automobile Sales, Perkins met co-workers Marshall Grant and A.W. 'Red' Kernodle. Grant, Kernodle and Perkins began bringing their guitars to work, and would play together when repair business was slow.

When Johnny Cash moved to Memphis after returning from Germany in 1954, Roy Cash introduced him to Grant, Kernodle and Perkins. The four began to get together in the evenings at Perkins' or Grant's home and play songs. It was during this time that they decided to form a band, with Grant acquiring a string bass, Kernodle a six-string steel guitar, and Perkins buying a somewhat-abused Fender Esquire electric guitar from the O.K. Houck Piano Co. in Memphis. The guitar had been modified by a previous owner, and the volume and tone controls did not work.

"Boom-chicka-boom" style

In order to tone down the sustained bottom end so that it would not compete with the other instruments, Perkins began the practice of muting the three bass strings (E, A and D) with the heel of his right hand, much in the style of Merle Travis, and scratching a rhythm pattern (as heard on Sun Records recordings prior to 1958). This pattern developed into a more defined, varying 1/8-8/5/8-8 picking (with random syncopation) on later Sun recordings and for the rest of Perkins’ career.

In late 1954, when Cash got an audition with producer Sam Phillips at Sun Records, he brought Perkins, Grant and Kernodle along to back him instrumentally. The experience made Kernodle nervous, and he ended up leaving before the session was over, with Perkins and Grant providing the instrumentation.

Perkins, as a member of the Tennessee Two (later, the Tennessee Three, with the addition of drummer W.S. "Fluke" Holland), toured with Cash and appeared on most of his recordings. He was well known for his laconic, focused demeanor on stage. He was often the target of jokes by Cash, who would make comments such as "Luther's been dead for years, but he just doesn't know it".

Perkins was Cash's lead guitarist on many of the popular Town Hall Party television appearances in the 1950s, often interacting with one another for stage effect and providing the signature "boom-chick-a-boom" background sound that came to define a large part of Johnny Cash's sound.  In his 1997 memoir Cash, the singer recalled, "Keith Richards came to one of our British shows, at a U.S. military base in the early '60s, but he wasn't interested in me; Luther was the one he couldn't wait to watch."

Personal life

Perkins was married twice. He and his first wife, Bertie Lee Moore (1927-2016), separated while they were living in Southern California in 1959. Perkins had three daughters: Linda Kay (1949-2017), Vickie, and Claudia. He later married Margie Higgins; Margie Higgins' niece Kathy lived with them. Margie Perkins Beaver still appears at Johnny Cash reunion events.

His hobbies were knitting, fishing and guitar.

He was a close friend of singer-songwriter Kris Kristofferson. At the time of his death, he was planning to open his own music publishing company and give Kristofferson his first break.

Perkins’ younger brother, Thomas, was a successful rock ‘n’ roll singer in the 1950s and 1960s, under the name of Thomas Wayne.

In his autobiography, Johnny Cash wrote that Perkins was mildly addicted to amphetamines. They started taking drugs together in the late 1950s.

Perkins' nickname since childhood was "L.M" (pronounced "ellem"), the initials of his first and second name "Luther Monroe". Singer-guitarist Carl Perkins, who was also a member of Cash's touring show, was not related to Luther Perkins.

Death

During the early morning hours of August 3, 1968, Perkins returned from fishing on Old Hickory Lake to his newly constructed home on Riverwood Drive, Hendersonville, Tennessee. He allegedly  went to sleep in the living room while holding a lit cigarette, even though he hadn’t smoked in years by this time, according to family. His niece, by marriage, awoke around 6:00 am to find the living room aflame and Perkins collapsed near the door, almost dead. An emergency crew rushed Perkins to Vanderbilt University Hospital, where he was kept under intensive care until he died two days later.

He is buried near the graves of Johnny Cash and June Carter Cash at Hendersonville Memorial Park in Hendersonville, Tennessee.

Luther Perkins was inducted into the Rockabilly Hall of Fame, as inductee #0230.

In 1980, Perkins's daughters from his first marriage filed suit against Johnny Cash for embezzling funds that were to have provided retirement income for Perkins. This lawsuit was filed coincidentally with actions taken by the other founding Tennessee Three member, Marshall Grant, against Cash for wrongfully firing Grant and embezzlement of Grant's retirement funds. Both lawsuits were eventually settled out-of-court.

Walk the Line
In Walk the Line, the 2005 biopic of Johnny Cash, Perkins is portrayed by Dan John Miller. Perkins's future death is alluded to in the film in a bus scene where Cash (played by Joaquin Phoenix) walks past Perkins. Perkins is depicted as asleep with a lit cigarette in his mouth. Cash removes the cigarette and stubs it out in the ashtray in front of Perkins.

References

External links

 Rockabilly Hall Of Fame page
 A Luther Perkins Website
 

1928 births
1968 deaths
American country guitarists
American rockabilly guitarists
American male guitarists
Deaths from fire
Musicians from Memphis, Tennessee
Sun Records artists
20th-century American guitarists
Guitarists from Tennessee
Lead guitarists
People from Como, Mississippi
20th-century American male musicians
The Tennessee Three members